A philanthropist is a person who actively promotes human welfare; a person who practices philanthropy.

Philanthropist may also refer to:

 Philanthropist (award), to recognize achievements of people with disabilities in culture and the arts
 The Philanthropist (journal), a Canadian academic journal
 The Philanthropist (play), by Christopher Hampton (1971)
 The Philanthropist (Cincinnati, Ohio), an American abolitionist newspaper
 The Philanthropist (TV series), a 2009 American action series

See also 
 List of philanthropists
 :Category:Philanthropists